Jacques Grandjean (born 1 March 1954) is a Belgian former professional tennis player.

Grandjean was a Davis Cup representative for Belgium and debuted in a 1982 tie against Israel in Eupen, losing his singles rubber in five sets to Shahar Perkiss. In 1983 he featured in further ties against Poland and West Germany. He reached a best singles world ranking of 289 and took a set off Johan Kriek (world no. 16) at the 1983 Brussels Indoor, one of his two Grand Prix circuit main draw appearances. He won a national championship in doubles in 1985.

See also
List of Belgium Davis Cup team representatives

References

External links
 
 
 

1954 births
Living people
Belgian male tennis players